Herndon may refer to:

People
 Herndon (surname), an American surname
 Herndon Davis (1901–1962), American artist, journalist, illustrator, and painter

Places in the United States

Communities
 Herndon, California, an unincorporated community
 Herndon, Georgia, an unincorporated community
 Herndon, Kansas, a city
 Herndon, Kentucky, an unincorporated community
 Herndon, Missouri, an unincorporated community
 Herndon, Pennsylvania, a borough
 Herndon, Virginia, a town
 Herndon Historic District, a national historic district
 Herndon, West Virginia, an unincorporated community
 Herndon Homes, a former housing project in Atlanta, Georgia

Historic buildings and monuments
 Herndon Building, a historic professional building in Atlanta, Georgia
 Herndon Depot Museum, a historic railroad depot museum in Herndon, Virginia
 Herndon Hall, a historic house in Des Moines, Iowa
 Herndon Home, a historic house museum in Atlanta, Georgia
 Herndon Monument, a monument in Annapolis, Maryland
 Herndon Terrace, a historic house in Union, South Carolina

Schools
 Herndon Career Center, a career and technical high school in Raytown, Missouri
 Herndon High School, a public high school in Herndon, Virginia
 Herndon High School (Kansas), a former high school in Herndon, Kansas

Transportation centers
 Herndon station, a planned Washington Metro station in Herndon, Virginia
 Orlando Executive Airport, a public airport in Orlando, Florida, formerly called Herndon Airport

Other
 Herndon House, a former hotel in Omaha, Nebraska
 Herndon Stadium, an abandoned stadium in Atlanta, Georgia

Ships
 USS Herndon, the name of more than one United States Navy ship
 USS Raymon W. Herndon (APD-121), a United States Navy high-speed transport in commission from 1944 to 1946